Despina Papamichail was the defending champion but lost in the second round to Victoria Duval.

Carol Zhao won the title, defeating Himeno Sakatsume in the final, 3–6, 6–4, 6–4.

Seeds

Draw

Finals

Top half

Bottom half

References

External Links
Main Draw

LTP Charleston Pro Tennis 2 - Singles